"Church, I'm Fully Saved To-Day" is a gospel blues song recorded by Blind Willie Johnson in 1930, with backing vocals by Willie B. Harris, sometimes identified as his first wife. It was released on Columbia 14582-D, as B-side to "The Soul of a Man".  The song is derived from the hymn "Fully Saved Today" by William J. Henry (words) and Clarence E. Hunter (music), published in 1911, and follows a call-and-response format. 

The subject-matter is said to be Psalm 96:2, "Sing unto the Lord, bless his name; shew forth his salvation from day to day". The words of the verses of hymn and song differ, but the refrains are similar. This is the refrain of the hymn:

References 

Gospel songs
1911 songs
Blind Willie Johnson songs
Columbia Records singles